David M. Benett (born 1958) is a British society and celebrity photographer based in London. Since 2004, Benett has been a contributing photographer for Getty Images, specialising in candid photography of celebrities — work for which he has twice been awarded Photographer of the Year awards from the UK Picture Editors' Guild.

Biography

Early years

Dave Benett was born in 1958.

Photographic career

In 1975 he moved  from Liverpool to London where he started working as a photographer for television and newspapers. Benett first worked on news and sport at London News Service and Sport & General in the City, close to Fleet Street, before quickly discovering his metier in celebrity photography. During this period he divided his time between news and showbiz, covering era defining news events like the Brixton riots, the trial of Dennis Nilsen and gangs of skinheads in South End for national papers as well as what was then Thames News.

From 1983 Dave began focussing solely on show business events in the early days of the paparazzi, establishing himself as a celebrity photographer. Benett worked at globally recognized events such as the Free Mandela concerts, as well as covering London's celebrity elite as they partied at all the hottest night spots of the 80s.

During the early 90s Benett crossed over to being an 'inside' photographer, as his connections with The Evening Standard afforded personal invitations and accreditation for major cultural events. He has been the Evening Standard's main photographer for arts, culture and showbiz events since the mid 80s, not only working at major events with national appeal but also covering almost every major theatre first night in london for the last 30 years.

Benett has gained a reputation as a trusted photographer of celebrities in candid moments and has thereby gained admission to a number of exclusive events, even working as official photographer for the Queen Mother's 99th birthday. He has published many of these images around the world.

Move to Getty

He joined Getty Images's contributors in 2004 after 14 years at Alpha Photographers Ltd.

Dave received the Picture Editors' Guild Celebrity Photographer of the Year Award in both 2011 and 2013  and is currently regularly published in The London Evening Standard, The Daily Express, The Daily  Star, The I, Grazia, Hello, Harpers Bazaar, Esquire and GQ magazine.

Motor racing

Benett has, for a number of years, raced a Porsche 997 GT3 Cup car in the Britcar Endurance Championship with Marcus Fothergill. He has competed in every iteration of the Britcar series, including the 24 hour races at Silverstone.

Awards

 2011 UK Picture Editors' Guild Celebrity Photographer of the Year Award
 2013 UK Picture Editors' Guild Fashion and Entertainment Photographer of the Year Award

Footnotes

External links
 Dave Benett Photography
 Getty Images, "Photographer Profile: Dave Benett," Photo Archive News.com, www.photoarchivenews.com/ (Video.)

1958 births
Living people
Photographers from Liverpool
Britcar drivers